Roman Catholic Theology Faculty of the Comenius University in Bratislava (skr. RKCMBF UK) is one of the thirteen faculties of Comenius University in Bratislava.  It is the oldest existing theological faculty in the Slovak Republic.  The Dean is ThDr. Ing. Vladimir Thurzo, PhD.

References

Comenius University